Private Radio is the debut album by American actor and singer-songwriter Billy Bob Thornton.  His first foray into recorded music following a successful movie career up to the time of the album's release, it was a traditional country music album released by Universal Records in September 2001.

The song "Angelina" is a song written for his then-wife Angelina Jolie.

Track listing
All tracks composed by Billy Bob Thornton and Marty Stuart; except where indicated
 "Dark and Mad" 
 "Forever"
 "Angelina" (Billy Bob Thornton, Randy Scruggs)
 "Starlight Lounge" (Billy Bob Thornton, Dwight Yoakam, Holly Lamar)
 "Walk of Shame" 
 "Smoking in Bed"
 "Your Blue Shadow" 
 "That Mountain"
 "He Was a Friend of Mine" (Roger McGuinn)
 "Private Radio" (Billy Bob Thornton, Marty Stuart, Mark Collie)
 "Beauty at the Back Door" 
 "Lost Highway" (Leon Payne)

Personnel
Billy Bob Thornton – vocals; drums on "Your Blue Shadow"
Marty Stuart – guitar, mandolin; bass on "Your Blue Shadow"
Brad Davis – guitar
Steve Armold – bass
Barry Beckett – organ
Jim Cox – piano
Gregg Stocki – drums, percussion
Billy Bob Thornton, Brad Davis, Dennis Locorriere, Marty Stuart – backing vocals
with:
Randy Scruggs – guitar, bass, co-production on "Angelina"
Holly Lander – vocals on "Starlight Lounge"
Larry Paxton – bass on "Starlight Lounge"
Hank Singer – fiddle on "Lost Highway"
Don Helms – pedal steel on "Lost Highway"

2001 debut albums
Billy Bob Thornton albums